Connellsville Union Passenger Depot, also known as the Connellsville Pittsburgh & Lake Erie Station, is a historic railway station located at Connellsville, Fayette County, Pennsylvania.  It was built between 1911 and 1912 by the Pittsburgh and Lake Erie Railroad and Western Maryland Railway.  It is a 1 1/2-story, rectangular brick building measuring 109 feet by 28 feet. It features a three-story tower, wide overhanging eaves, and hipped roofs on the building and tower covered in blue-green Spanish terra cotta tiles.  It is in an American Craftsman style of architecture.  It ceased use as a passenger station in 1939, after which it housed a car dealership and auto parts store.  It was purchased by the Youghiogheny Opalescent Glass Company in the spring of 1995.

It was added to the National Register of Historic Places in 1996.

See also
 Connellsville station

References

External links
Youghiogheny Opalescent Glass Company

Railway stations on the National Register of Historic Places in Pennsylvania
Railway stations in the United States opened in 1912
Connellsville, Pennsylvania
Connellsville
Connellsville
Railway stations closed in 1939
1912 establishments in Pennsylvania
National Register of Historic Places in Fayette County, Pennsylvania
American Craftsman architecture in Pennsylvania
Arts and Crafts architecture in the United States
American architectural styles
1939 disestablishments in Pennsylvania
Former railway stations in Pennsylvania
Repurposed railway stations in the United States